Garakamanthana Palya or G. M. Palya is one of the neighbourhoods in Bengaluru. It is part of C. V. Raman Nagar Assembly constituency in East Bengaluru. It is named after Garakamantha (Jatayu, brother of Garuda, who fought with demon king Ravana). Kaggadasapura, Vignananagar, Basavanagar, Malleshpalya, BEML, LBS Nagar, Shivananda Nagar, Puttappa Layout, Byrasandra, Cauveri Colony, Krishnappa Gardeen, C. V. Raman Nagar, Vimanapura are the nearby localities.

Location

It is located east of Suranjan Das Road and connected by Suranjan Das Road, Namjoshi Road and Kaggadasapura Main Road.

References

Neighbourhoods in Bangalore